The 2012 National Women Football Championship was the 8th season of the National Women Football Championship, the top-tier of women's football in Pakistan. The tournament ran from 28 September to 9 October 2012 in Jinnah Sports Stadium, Islamabad.

Young Rising Stars were able to defend their title and win their fourth National Championship by beating WAPDA 2–0 on penalties in the final, after the match had ended 1-1.

Teams 
A total of 12 teams took part in the tournament:

 Azad Jammu and Kashmir
 Balochistan United
 Higher Education Commission
 Islamabad
 Khyber Pakhtunkhwa
 Lahore School of Economics
 Pakistan Army
 Punjab
 Sindh
 TCS
 WAPDA
 Young Rising Stars

Knockout stage

Semi-finals

Third-place match

Final

Awards 
In a special meeting on 25 September 2012, PFF President Faisal Saleh Hayat approved the prize money package for the tournament. The following awards were presented in the closing ceremony:

 Winner's trophy plus Rs. 3,00,000 cash: Young Rising Stars
 Runner-up trophy plus Rs. 2,00,000 cash: WAPDA,
 Third position trophy plus Rs. 150,000 cash: Balochistan United
 Fairplay trophy plus Rs 40,000 cash: Vehari United,
 Best Goalkeeper trophy plus Rs. 40,000 cash: Syeda Mahpara (Young Rising Stars)
 Best Player (Misha Dawood Trophy) plus Rs. 50,000 cash: Asmara Habib (Young Rising Stars)
 Top Goal Scorer plus Rs. 40,000 cash: Hajra Khan (Diya)
 Best Referee plus Rs. 30,000 cash: Imran Hussain (Karachi)
 Best assistant referee (female) plus Rs. 15,000 cash: Yasmin Zareen

References 

National Women Football Championship seasons
2012 in Pakistani sport
2012 in Pakistani women's sport
2012 in Pakistan
2010s in Islamabad